The Santa Margarita Stakes is an American Thoroughbred horse race run annually in early April at Santa Anita Park in Arcadia, California for fillies and mares age four and older, it is contested on dirt over a distance of one and one-eighths miles.

A Grade I event for most of its history, in 2019 it was downgraded to Grade II.

Inaugurated in 1935, the race was open to all horses age three and older until 1938 when it was restricted to fillies and mares.

Since inception, the Santa Margarita Handicap has been raced at various distances:
 7 furlongs : 1935–1936
 6 furlongs : 1937
 8.5 furlongs ( miles) 1938–1941, 1945–1948, 1953–1954.
 9 furlongs ( miles) : 1949–1952, 1955 present

There was no race from 1942 through 1944 as a result of World War II.

The Santa Margarita Handicap was run in two divisions in 1964. The first time it was run as an invitational event was in 1968.

Records
Speed record: (at current distance of  miles)
 1:47.00 – Lady's Secret (1986)

Most wins:
 2 – Our Betters (1956, 1957)
 2 – Curious Clover (1964, 1965)
 2 – Tizna – (1974, 1975)
 2 – Bayakoa (1989, 1990)
 2 – Paseana (1992, 1994)

Most wins by a jockey:
 6 – Bill Shoemaker (1951, 1952, 1954, 1966, 1972, 1979)
 6 – Laffit Pincay Jr. (1967, 1971, 1973, 1981, 1982, 1989)
 6 – Chris McCarron (1980, 1985, 1990, 1992, 1994, 1996)

Most wins by a trainer:
 6 – Ron McAnally (1989, 1990, 1992, 1994, 1995, 1998)

Most wins by an owner:
 3 – C. V. Whitney (1947, 1959, 1960)
 3 – Ethel D. Jacobs (1961, 1966, 1984)
 3 – William Haggin Perry (1964, 1968, 1969)

Winners of the Santa Margarita Stakes since 1935

References 

 The 2008 Santa Margarita Invitational Handicap at the NTRA

Horse races in California
Santa Anita Park
Flat horse races for four-year-old fillies
Mile category horse races for fillies and mares
Grade 1 stakes races in the United States
Recurring sporting events established in 1935